Stigmella abaiella is a moth of the family Nepticulidae. It is found in Iran.

The wingspan is about 3.5 mm.

The larvae feed on Pyrus communis.

External links
Beiträge Zur Kenntnis der Nepticuliden. Beschreibung Zweier Neuer Arten Stigmella abaiella n.sp. Und Trifurcula (Fedalmia) sanctibenedicti n.sp. (Lepidoptera, Monotrysia)

Nepticulidae
Moths of the Middle East
Moths described in 1979